Ross Evans Paulson was an American historian. He was born in 1935 and died in 2011.

He taught at Augustana College from 1962 to 1995, and was professor emeritus.
His papers are held at Augustana College Library.

Awards
1967 Frederick Jackson Turner Award

Works

Criticism
"Review: The Myth of the Lost Cause", The American Historical Review

References

External links
"Review: Radicalism & Reform", The Journal of American History, Jeremy P. Felt, Vol. 55, No. 3 (Dec., 1968), pp. 645-647

21st-century American historians
21st-century American male writers
Augustana College (Illinois) faculty
Living people
Year of birth missing (living people)
American male non-fiction writers